Huckleberry "Huck" Hound is a fictional cartoon character, a blue anthropomorphic coonhound that speaks with a Tennessee Southern drawl. He first appeared in the series The Huckleberry Hound Show. The cartoon was one of six TV shows to win an Emmy Award in 1960 as an "Outstanding Achievement in the Field of Children's Programming"; the first animated series to receive such an award.

Most of his short films consist of Huck trying to perform jobs in different fields, ranging from policeman to dogcatcher, with results that backfire, yet usually coming out on top, either through slow persistence or sheer luck. Huck does not seem to exist in a specific time period as he has also been a Roman gladiator, a medieval knight, and a rocket scientist. He also appears in futuristic cartoons, as an intergalactic space policeman, alongside other Hanna-Barbera characters. The trademark of Huck was his tone-deaf and inaccurate rendition of "Oh My Darling, Clementine", often used as a running gag.

Concept and creation
In 1953, Tex Avery created a character known as the Southern Wolf (later Dixie Wolf in The Tom & Jerry Show) for his MGM cartoons The Three Little Pups and Billy Boy. Introduced as an antagonist to Droopy, the wolf had a southern drawl and laid-back mannerisms provided by Daws Butler. The most memorable trait of the character was that whenever something painful or unpleasant happened to him, the Wolf never lost his cool; instead, he calmly talked to the audience or kept whistling the song "Year of Jubilo". After Avery left MGM, William Hanna and Joseph Barbera produced two more shorts with the character. In two of his cartoons (Billy Boy and Blackboard Jumble) the wolf plays a role that was exactly like a usual Huckleberry Hound short, aside from his frequent use of slang, and the echo-like repetition of words he had only in Billy Boy. Sheep Wrecked was the wolf's final appearance.

Huck's name is a reference to the 1884 American novel Adventures of Huckleberry Finn, written by Mark Twain. Hanna and Barbera almost named Yogi Bear "Huckleberry Bear".

He was voiced in the original cartoons in 1958 by Daws Butler, who had given a similar voice and characterization to the dog characters Reddy in The Ruff and Reddy Show and Smedley in Walter Lantz's Chilly Willy shorts. The voice for Huck was actually inspired by a neighbor of Butler's wife, Myrtis Martin, in her hometown Albemarle, North Carolina. Butler would visit Myrtis and her family and would talk to the neighbor who was a veterinarian. Butler found the man's voice amusing and remembered it when it came time to voice Huck. The voice bore similarities to that of Andy Griffith, who likewise based his character accent on a rural North Carolina town (in Griffith's case, Mount Airy), and Hanna-Barbera was known for its characters' voices being parodies of known celebrities; Butler, who had been using the accent for about a decade before Griffith became famous, denied using Griffith as an inspiration.

Huckleberry's voice was originally loud, enthusiastic and joyful, to fit his occupation of a circus showman. As the show progressed, it became deeper, and calmer.

Role in later productions
 Huckleberry appeared in The Yogi Bear Show episode "Yogi's Birthday Party" where he and the others help celebrate Yogi Bear's birthday.
 Huck makes a cameo in the Top Cat episode "King for a Day", in a comic cover along with Yogi.
 Huckleberry, Yogi, Boo-Boo, Snagglepuss, Quick Draw McGraw, Magilla Gorilla and the others traveled around America in the half-hour series Yogi's Gang. Debuting in 1973, the characters traveled in Ark Lark, a hot air balloon. They solved problems including Mr. Waste's pollution, Mr. Bigot's bigotry, and other various issues.
 Huckleberry appeared as a member of "The Yogi Yahooeys" team on Scooby's All-Star Laff-A-Lympics from 1977 to 1979.
 The Galaxy Goof-Ups segment of the 1978 series Yogi's Space Race featured new characters Captain Snerdley, Scare Bear, and Quack-Up the Duck with returnees Huckleberry and Yogi, traveling through space to multiple planets in a race throughout the galaxy. The one episode of Yogi's Space Race also reveals Huck's origin in Memphis, Tennessee. The series soon split off to its own half-hour program where Huckleberry Hound, Yogi Bear, Scare Bear, and Quack-Up are bumbling intergalactic police officers.
 In 1979, Huck appeared alongside Yogi and the gang in Casper's First Christmas, in which they meet Casper the Friendly Ghost and Hairy Scary.
 Yogi's First Christmas (1980) featured Huckleberry and others helping Yogi Bear prevent Jellystone Lodge's owner from tearing it down.
 In Yogi Bear's All Star Comedy Christmas Caper (1982), Huck drives in a van, bringing Snagglepuss, Hokey Wolf, Quick Draw McGraw, Augie Doggie and Doggie Daddy, and Snooper and Blabber to Jellystone Park, before discovering that Yogi and Boo-Boo have escaped to a department store.
 Syndicated series The Funtastic World of Hanna-Barbera included a segment in 1985 called Yogi's Treasure Hunt; Huckleberry appeared alongside characters including Yogi and Boo-Boo, Ranger Smith, Quick Draw McGraw, Snagglepuss, Dick Dastardly and Muttley, and Top Cat. This show also debuted Huck's superhero alter-ego called "Huckle Hero".
 In 1987, Huck appeared in the television film Yogi Bear and the Magical Flight of the Spruce Goose, traveling around the world, saving animals and fending off the Dread Baron and Mumbly.
 Huck's starring role comeback was in the Western television film The Good, the Bad, and Huckleberry Hound (1988), where he is portrayed as a reluctant town sheriff who attempts to outwit the menacing Dalton brothers and falls in love with the Native American chief's daughter, Desert Flower, for whom he performs a different song "By the Light of the Silvery Moon".
 In the Wake, Rattle, and Roll (1990) segment, Fender Bender 500, Huck teams up with Snagglepuss in their monster truck called "Half Dog, Half Cat, Half Track" throughout the race courses.
 Huckleberry appeared as a teenager in the 1991 series Yo Yogi!, voiced by Greg Berg. One of his enemies, Wee Willie, was also featured as an adolescent, vocalized by Rob Paulsen.
 On June 11, 2000, Cartoon Network aired a short film called "Sound Hound" as part of a series of short animations called "Cartoon Network Shorties" that would eventually be moved with the short musical animations known as "Cartoon Network Groovies" to its other channel devoted to old classics, Boomerang. The short features Huckleberry as the lead character. Attempting to sing his signature song "Oh My Darling, Clementine", he is repeatedly interrupted by the sounds of New York City, like car horns, jackhammers, and birds, and a visibly irritated Huckleberry zips a radio host's mouth closed, interrupts a man and woman's phone calls, and silences two teenagers rocking in a car, all rendered with cutout animation. As he finally begins to sing, all the people he silenced begin to scream in agony, due to his singing being so terribly loud.
 Huck made a pictured cameo in the Harvey Birdman, Attorney at Law episode "Droopy Botox". He also made a cameo appearance in the last episode "The Death of Harvey".
 Huckleberry Hound appears in the series Jellystone!, voiced by Jim Conroy. He is shown to be the mayor of Jellystone with Mr. Jinks serving as his personal assistant.

Guest appearances
 Huck appeared in The Simpsons episode "Behind the Laughter", voiced by Karl Wiedergott. Near the end of the episode, he confesses: "I was so gay, but I couldn't tell anyone".
 Huckleberry Hound appeared in The Brak Show episode "Poppy". He eats Brak's grandfather's nose rubber.
 Huckleberry Hound appears in the Johnny Bravo episode "Back on Shaq", voiced by James Arnold Taylor. He appears as Seth Green's good luck charm in his basketball match against Shaquille O'Neal and Johnny Bravo.
 Huck appeared in the Evil Con Carne episode "Hector, King of the Britons", voiced by Tom Kenny. Though he is not seen in the episode, his voice is impersonated by Hector Con Carne when he is asked by the Lady of the Lake to act out a fight between him and Mojo Jojo, who he also impersonates.
 Huck appears in The Grim Adventures of Billy & Mandy episode "Irwin Gets a Clue", where he gets run over by Hoss Delgado's monster truck.
 Huck appeared in the Robot Chicken episode "Ban on the Fun". In a segment that parodies Laff-A-Lympics in the style of the Munich massacre, he along with the Yogi Yahooeys were murdered by the Really Rottens.
 Huckleberry briefly appeared in a MetLife commercial that aired in 2012.
 Huckleberry appeared as a guest star in the 2017 reboot Wacky Races, voiced by Billy West. In one episode "Hong Kong Screwy", he appears as Peter Perfect's stunt double in scenes where the racers and Hong Kong Phooey fight the soldiers of the evil organization K.I.T.T.Y. led by Golden Paw. In the other episode "Slow and Steady", Huck joins the racers and Ricochet Rabbit in a romp through the Appalachian Mountains against Touché Turtle.
 Huckleberry Hound made a cameo appearance in the Animaniacs segment "Suffragette City".

In other media
 Huckleberry is the singing narrator of a parody recording of Lorne Greene's song, "Ringo", called "Bingo, Ringo" where the hound meets a man who appears to resemble The Beatles drummer, Ringo Starr, punctuated with considerable percussion.
 Huckleberry Hound in Hollywood Capers is a 1993 computer game for MS-DOS, Amiga, and Atari ST, released only in Europe. It was, in fact, adapted from an earlier game, Dino Jr. in Canyon Capers.
 Huck appeared as a closeted dog who is Snagglepuss's friend and Quick Draw McGraw's lover in the six-issue comic book miniseries Exit, Stage Left!: The Snagglepuss Chronicles.
 Huck appeared in Green Lantern/Huckleberry Hound Special #1.
 Huck appears in The Freddy Funko Show as Freddy's co-host, voiced by Chris Finney.

In other languages

See also
 The Huckleberry Hound Show
 List of The Huckleberry Hound Show episodes
 List of Hanna-Barbera characters

Notes

References

External links
 

 
Anthropomorphic dogs
Fictional characters from Tennessee
Fictional circus performers
Fictional farmers
Fictional firefighters
Fictional inventors
Fictional sheriffs
Fictional singers
Fictional string musicians
Fictional United States Postal Service workers
Hanna-Barbera characters
Male characters in animation
Television characters introduced in 1958
Yogi Bear characters